Nikki Ross may refer to:

 Nikki Sievwright (1943–2018), née Ross, English fashion model
 Nikki Ross (singer), American gospel singer